Hell or High Water is a 2002 blues album by Tinsley Ellis. It was recorded and mixed at Stonehenge at ZAC Atlanta, Georgia by Eddy Offord and Jimmy Zumpano, mastered by Rodney Mills and produced by Eddy Offord with Robert Woods as executive producer and Michael Rothschild as co-ordinating producer. Tinsley wrote all the songs.

Track listing
 "Hell or High Water"
 "Hooked"
 "Mystery to Me"
 "I'll Get Over You"
 "Love Comes Knockin'"
 "Stuck in Love"
 "Real Bad Way"
 "All Rumors Are True"
 "All I Can Do"
 "Love Me By Phone"
 "Feelin' No Pain"
 "Ten Year Day"
 "Set Love Free"

Musicians
Tinsley Ellis on Guitar and vocals
Phillip Skipper on Bass guitar  
Kenny Kilgore on guitar 
Scott Callison on drums 
Kevin McKendree on keyboards  
Donna Hopkins on  background vocals

References

External links
Tinsley Ellis website

2002 albums
Tinsley Ellis albums